Eden Marama (born 13 February 1986) is a retired New Zealand female tennis player.

In her career, she won three singles titles and eight doubles titles on the ITF circuit. On 22 March 2004, she reached her best singles ranking of world No. 321. On 26 April 2004, she peaked at No. 301 in the doubles rankings.

Playing for New Zealand Fed Cup team, Marama has a win–loss record of 4–6.

ITF circuit finals

Singles: 3 (3–0)

Doubles: 9 (8–1)

References

External links
 
 
 

New Zealand female tennis players
1986 births
Living people
Sportspeople from Wellington City
21st-century New Zealand women